This is a list of all past winners of the official Christy Ring Cup Champion 15 Awards.

Winners
Unlike the Vodafone All Stars, the 15 players selected are not chosen by position and players received nominations at the end of each game from opposing team managers. Under the selection format, the champions have three players honoured with two players from the beaten finalists and semi-finalists also being recognised in addition to one player from each of the other participating Counties

2005
Enda McLoughlin, Killian Cosgrove and Andrew Mitchell (Westmeath), Garret Johnson and Martin Coulter (Down), Pat Coady and Robert Foley (Carlow), Mattie Dowd and David Harney (Kildare), Gregory Biggs (Derry), John Mike Dooley (Kerry), Keith Higgins (Mayo), Joey Toole (Meath), Mike Keaveney (Roscommon) and Joe Murphy (Wicklow).

2006
Malachy Molloy, Paddy Richmond , Ciaran Herron (all Antrim), Pat Coady, Des Murphy (both Carlow), Eoin Hannon (Kildare), Paudie Reidy (Kildare), Paddy Barrett (Mayo), Paul Braniff (Down), Gary Savage (Down), Joe Murphy (Wicklow), Aidan Healy (Kerry), Michael Kelly (Roscommon), Fergus McMahon (London) and David Donnelly (Meath).

2007
Patrick Clarke, Paddy Dowdall, Derek Mac Nicholas (all Westmeath), David Kennedy, Billy White (Kildare), Enda Keogh, Stephen Clynch (Meath), Andrew Gaul, Edward Coady (Carlow), Shane Brick (Kerry), Stephen Broderick (Mayo), Graham Clarke (Down), Don Hyland (Wicklow), Keith Kennedy (London), Michael Conway (Derry)

2008
Mark Brennan (Carlow), John Rogers (Carlow), Shane Kavanagh (Carlow), Brendan Murtagh (Westmeath), Paul Greville (Westmeath), Aidan Connolly (Mayo), Stephen Henry (Derry), Micheál Kelly (Roscommon), Nial Hackett (Meath), Tony Murphy (Kildare), Jonathan O Neill (Wicklow), Paul Braniff (Down), Eugene McDonnell (Armagh), Niall Healy (London), John Griffin (Kerry)

2009
Andrew Gaul (Carlow), Shane Kavanagh (Carlow), John Rogers (Carlow), James Hickey (Carlow), Fintan Conway (Down), Sean Ennis (Down), Ruari McGrattan (Down), Conor Ryan (Mayo), Adrian Freeman (Mayo), Tom Murnane (Kerry), Shane Brick (Kerry), Paul Dermody (Kildare), Jeffrey Bermingham (Wicklow), Greg Gavin (Westmeath), Sean McCullagh (Derry),

2010

2011
James Godley, Jason Casey, Shane Nolan, Darragh O’ Connell (Kerry), Eamonn Kearns, Stephen Kelly, Andy O’ Brien (Wicklow), John Doran, Tony Murphy (Kildare), Eoin Clarke, Brendan Ennis (Down), Cahal Carvill (Armagh), Oisin McCloskey (Derry), Shane Morley (Mayo ), Shane McGann (Meath).

2012
Brian Costello, Jonathan Maher, Eddie Walsh, Ger Fennelly (London), Eamonn Kearns,	Jonathan O’Neill, Ronan Keddy (Wicklow), Paul Braniff, Conor Woods (Down), Willie Mahady, Steven Clynch (Meath), Mark Moloney (Kildare), Alan Grant (Derry), Donal O’Brien (Mayo), Paud Costello (Kerry).

2013
Paul Braniff (Down), Gareth Johnson (Down), Conor Woods (Down), Patrick Hughes (Down), Bernard Rochford (Kerry), Darren Dineen (Kerry), Shane Nolan (Kerry), Fiachra Ó Muineacháin (Kildare), Gerard Keegan (Kildare), Steven Clynch (Meath), Sean Heavey (Meath), Derek McDonnell (Mayo), Paddy Kelly (Derry), Liam Kennedy (Wicklow), Nathan Curry (Armagh).

2014
Richie Hoban (Kildare), Martin Fitzgerald (Kildare), Paul Dermody (Kildare), Gerry Keegan (Kildare), Bryan Murphy (Kerry), Daniel Collins (Kerry), Padraig Boyle (Kerry), Cormac Reilly (Meath), William McGrath (Meath), Ciaran Charlton (Mayo), David Kenny (Mayo), Aaron Kelly (Derry), Stephen Kelly (Wicklow), Stephen Renaghan (Armagh), Conor Woods (Down).

2015

 B Cuddihy (Wicklow), Keith Keoghan (Meath), M Ryan (London), K Feeney (Mayo), Bernard Deay (Kildare), Gerry Keegan (Kildare), D Toner (Down), F Conway (Down), S McCullagh (Derry), R Convery (Derry), C Quinn (Derry), Shane Nolan (Kerry), John Egan (Kerry), Patrick Kelly (Kerry), Keith Carmody (Kerry).

2016
Damien Healy (Meath), Adam Gannon (Meath), James  Toher (Meath), Shane McGann (Meath), Simon McCrory (Antrim), Eoghan Campbell (Antrim), Ciaran Clarke (Antrim), John Doran (Kildare), Gerry Keegan (Kildare), John McManus (Down), Caolan Taggart (Down), Oisin McCloskey (Derry), Luke Maloney (Wicklow), Tomás Lawrence (London), Micheál Kelly (Roscommon).

2017

Enda Cooney (London) Paul Divilly (Kildare) Ger McManus (Mayo) Padraig Kelly (Roscommon) Eamonn Kearns (Wicklow) Andy O’Brien (Wicklow) Michael Hughes (Down)
Eoghan Sands (Down) Chrissy O’Connell (Antrim) John Dillon (Antrim) Paddy Burke (Antrim) Alan Corcoran (Carlow) John Michael Nolan (Carlow)
James Doyle (Carlow) Richard Coady (Carlow).

References

Champion 15 Awards
Hurling awards